The Ethan Allen class of fleet ballistic missile submarine was an evolutionary development from the George Washington class.

Design
Rather than being designed as  attack submarines with a missile compartment added, the Ethan Allens were the first submarines designed "from the keel up" as Fleet Ballistic Missile (FBM) submarines carrying the Polaris A-2 missile. They were functionally similar to the George Washingtons, but longer and more streamlined and with torpedo tubes reduced to four. In the early and mid-1970s, they were upgraded to Polaris A3s.  Because their missile tubes could not be modified to carry the larger diameter Poseidon missile, they were not further upgraded.

Conversions
To comply with SALT II treaty limitations as the  ballistic missile submarines entered service, in the early 1980s the Ethan Allens were refitted and officially designated SSNs (fast attack submarines), but often referred to as a "slow approach". Their missile fire control systems were removed and the missile tubes were filled with concrete. Sam Houston and John Marshall were further converted to carry SEALs or other Special Operations Forces, accommodating 67 troops each with dry deck shelters to accommodate SEAL Delivery Vehicles or other equipment.  The Ethan Allen-class submarines were decommissioned between 1983 and 1992.
All were disposed of through the nuclear Ship-Submarine Recycling Program 1992–1999.

Boats in class 
Submarines of the Ethan Allen class:

See also 

 "41 for Freedom" Fleet Ballistic Missile submarines
 Fleet Ballistic Missile
 List of submarines of the United States Navy
 List of submarine classes of the United States Navy

References

External links
 NavSource.org SSBN photo gallery index
 Federation of American Scientists

Submarine classes
 
 Ethan Allen class